Tritonus may refer to:
 Tritone (music), or augmented fourth, a dissonant interval of two pitches.
 Tritonus a German progressive rock band.